The WCW World Tag Team Championship (previously NWA (Mid-Atlantic) World Tag Team Championship) was a professional wrestling world tag team championship in World Championship Wrestling (WCW) and later the World Wrestling Federation (WWF, now WWE). It was the original world tag team title of WCW and remained active until it was unified with the WWF Tag Team Championship.

History 

The WCW Tag Team Championship was originally known as the NWA World Tag Team Championship of Mid-Atlantic Championship Wrestling (MACW) run by Jim Crockett Promotions (JCP). Following the title's introduction in 1975, the Minnesota Wrecking Crew became the inaugural champions on January 29. The title was renamed the WCW World Tag Team Championship in 1991 when Ted Turner bought JCP and it became World Championship Wrestling. Despite the title's name in MACW, the National Wrestling Alliance (NWA) did not recognize its own NWA World Tag Team Championship until 1992, when the NWA held a tournament to crown the first tag team recognized by all of the NWA territories. Terry Gordy and Steve Williams won the tournament. As a result of Gordy and Williams being the WCW World Tag Team Champions when they became NWA World Tag Team Champions, both titles were defended together until WCW left the NWA in September 1993. On January 17, 2008, the NWA withdrew its recognition of every WCW World Tag Team Champion linked to the NWA World Tag Team Championship, officially stating that their titles were formed in 1995.

In March 2001, the World Wrestling Federation (WWF) purchased WCW. Soon after, "The Invasion" took place in which the WCW/ECW Alliance was ultimately dismantled. During this time, the title was referred to as the WCW Tag Team Championship, with WWF wrestlers winning WCW titles, and WCW wrestlers winning WWF titles. At SummerSlam, the title was unified with the WWF Tag Team Championship in a steel cage match when the WCW Tag Team Champions at that time, Kane and The Undertaker, defeated Chris Kanyon and Diamond Dallas Page for the WWF Tag Team Championship. The titles were only unified temporarily, as Kane and The Undertaker first lost the WWF Tag Team Championship on the September 17 episode of Raw to The Dudley Boyz (Bubba Ray Dudley and D-Von Dudley), followed by the loss of the WCW Tag Team Championship on the September 25 episode of SmackDown! to Booker T and Test. At Survivor Series in November 2001, then WCW Tag Team Champions, The Dudley Boyz, defeated then-WWF Tag Team Champions The Hardy Boyz (Jeff Hardy and Matt Hardy) to unify the WCW and WWF Tag Team Championships. The former was then retired and WWE (the former WWF) officially recognizes The Dudley Boyz as the final WCW Tag Team Champions.

See also 
 List of former championships in WWE
 Tag team championships in WWE

Notes

External links 
 Mid-Atlantic Gateway.com - NWA World Tag Team Title History (Mid-Atlantic version) (partial list)
 Wrestling-Titles.com - NWA World Tag Team Title History (Mid-Atlantic version)
 Wrestling-Titles.com - WCW World Tag Team Title History

World Championship Wrestling championships
Tag team wrestling championships
National Wrestling Alliance championships
Jim Crockett Promotions championships
WWE tag team championships
Championships acquired by WWE